Wills Wing, Inc. (legally Sport Kites, Inc) is an American aircraft manufacturer based in Orange, California and previously located in Santa Ana, California. The company specializes in the design and manufacture of hang gliders in the form of ready-to-fly aircraft, plus hang glider harnesses and accessories.

The company was founded in 1973 by brothers Bob and Chris Wills.

The company sells a line of hang gliders including training and beginner gliders, intermediate and competition wings.

History

The company was formed as Sport Kites, Inc in 1973 and started doing business under the name Wills Wing in 1978.

In 1973 Chris Wills took first place and Bob Wills won second place in the first US National Hang Gliding Championships. The next year Bob Wills won first place and Chris Wills took second place at the second US Nationals.

Chris and Bob Wills' brother, Eric Wills, was killed in a hang gliding accident in 1974.

Chris Wills left the company in 1976 to attend medical school and pursue a career as a physician. Bob Wills was killed in a hang gliding accident while making a Jeep commercial on 24 June 1977. The majority ownership of the company was then sold to Rob Kells, Linda and Mike Meier and Steve Pearson. Kells died of prostate cancer in 2008.

By 1984 the company had become the largest hang glider manufacturer in North America and then later in the world.

The company also provides Wills Wing U2 and T2 gliders to Tecma Sport of Saint-Pierre-en-Faucigny, France for the European market.

A Wills Wing XC-185 hang glider is on display at the Canada Aviation and Space Museum, in Ottawa, while another Wills Wing glider is in the US Southwest Soaring Museum in Moriarty, New Mexico.

In 2012 Wills Wing Team Pilot Dustin Martin set a new world record for Cross Country Open Distance in a Hang Glider of 475 miles flying a Wills Wing T2C 144.

In June, 2021 Wills Wing announced that they will be "winding down operations and preparing to shut down production at our Orange facility as part of a process of closing down the Company" with a "successor entity" to be formed in Valle do Bravo, Mexico.

Aircraft 

List of aircraft built by Wills Wing:

Hang gliders
Current Production
Wills Wing Alpha
Wills Wing Falcon 
Wills Wing Sport 3
Wills Wing U2/U2C
Wills Wing T2/T2C

Out of Production
Wills Wing Alpha(Original)
Wills Wing Attack Duck
Wills Wing Condor
Wills Wing Duck
Wills Wing Fusion
Wills Wing Harrier
Wills Wing HP
Wills Wing HP AT
Wills Wing Omega
Wills Wing Omni
Wills Wing RamAir
Wills Wing Raven
Wills Wing Skyhawk
Wills Wing Spectrum
Wills Wing Sport
Wills Wing Sport American
Wills Wing Sport AT
Wills Wing Sport 2
Wills Wing SST
Wills Wing Super Sport
Wills Wing Talon
Wills Wing Ultra Sport
Wills Wing XC
Wills Wing Eagle
Paragliders
Wills Wing AT 123
Wills Wing AT 223

References

External links

Aircraft manufacturers of the United States
Hang gliders
Paragliders
Manufacturing companies established in 1973
1973 establishments in California